Joseph Winterburn (birth unknown – death unknown) was an English professional rugby league footballer who played in the 1910s and 1920s. He played at representative level for Yorkshire, and at club level for Victoria Rangers ARLFC (in Eccleshill, Bradford) and Bradford Northern (captain), as a forward (prior to the specialist positions of), during the era of contested scrums.

Playing career

County Honours
Joe Winterburn won caps for Yorkshire while at Bradford Northern.

County Cup final appearance
Joe Winterburn played as a forward, i.e. number 8, and was captain, in Bradford Northern's 3–19 defeat by Huddersfield ("The Team of All Talents") in the 1913 Yorkshire County Cup Final during the 1913–14 season at Thrum Hall, Halifax on Saturday 29 November 1913, in front of a crowd of 12,000.

References

External links
Search for "Winterburn" at rugbyleagueproject.org
Image 'Yorkshire Cup Runners up 1913 - This Yorkshire Cup Runners up side was one of the bright spots of Northern's early life at Birch Lane. - 29/11/1913' at rlhp.co.uk
Image 'Joe Winterburn - Joe Winterburn, who captained the side in the 1913 Yorkshire Cup Final. He played for the club from 1911 until 1920 having previously played for Bradford Victoria Rangers. - 01/01/1913' at rlhp.co.uk

Bradford Bulls captains
Bradford Bulls players
English rugby league players
Place of birth missing
Place of death missing
Year of birth missing
Year of death missing
Yorkshire rugby league team players